Juan Ramírez may refer to:
Juan Ramírez (painter) Spanish painter portrait painter of the 16th century
Juan Ramírez (footballer, born 1965), Paraguayan football defender
Juan Andrés Ramírez (born 1947), Uruguayan politician and lawyer
Juan Ramirez (footballer, born 1984), Paraguayan football player for Pelita Jaya
Juan Carlos Ramírez (born 1977), Mexican professional boxer
Juan de Dios Ramírez Perales (born 1969), Mexican football international
Juan Diego Ramírez (born 1971), road cyclist from Colombia
Juan David Ramírez (born 1997), Colombian soccer player for the Austin Bold
Juan Edgardo Ramírez (born 1993), Argentinian football player for Boca Juniors
Juan Rubelín Ramírez, Dominican Republic freestyle wrestler

See also